In mathematics, a Takiff algebra is a Lie algebra over a truncated polynomial ring. More precisely, a Takiff algebra of a Lie algebra g over a field k is a Lie algebra of the form g[x]/(xn+1) = g⊗kk[x]/(xn+1) for some positive integer n. Sometimes these are called generalized Takiff algebras, and the name Takiff algebra is used for the case when n = 1.

References

Lie algebras
1971 in science